Pasqua may refer to:

Pasqua Lake, Saskatchewan, community in Saskatchewan
Pasqua Lake, lake in Saskatchewan
Pasqua First Nation, First Nations in Saskatchewan
Pasqua 79, Indian Reserve in Saskatchewan
Pasqua Hospital, hospital in Regina, Saskatchewan
Pasqua Coffee, a San Francisco-based retail coffee chain that was named the Pedestrian Café when it opened in 1983
Pasqua Rosée, the first coffeeshop proprietor of London

See also
Pasqua (surname), including a list of people with the name